Belagua may refer to:

Belagua Valley, a valley in Navarre, Spain
Belágua, a municipality in the state of Maranhão in the Northeast region of Brazil